Kane Brigg (born 14 January 1988) is a retired Australian high jumper and triple jumper.

He finished sixth at the 2005 World Youth Championships and eleventh at the 2006 World Junior Championships. He also competed at the 2006 Commonwealth Games without reaching the final. In 2006 he was the youngest male athlete on the Australian athletics team at the Melbourne Commonwealth Games

His personal best is 2.24 metres, first achieved in June 2007 in Gold Coast. He later switched to horizontal jumps. In March 2011 he recorded 16.97 metres in Perth and 7.45 metres in Melbourne.

Kane Brigg is Australia's greatest all-round jumper as at the end of 2013. His combination of 2.24 m (high jump), 16.97 m (triple jump) and 7.58 m (long jump - Sydney) was 3rd on the world all-time combination jumps list in 2011. His retirement at such a young age (26 years) is truly a great and tragic loss for the sport of athletics in Australia.

References

External links
 
 

1988 births
Living people
Australian male high jumpers
Australian male triple jumpers
Athletes (track and field) at the 2006 Commonwealth Games
Commonwealth Games competitors for Australia